El Hedi ben Salem ( 1935 – 1977) was a Moroccan actor, best known for his work with film director Rainer Werner Fassbinder.

Early life
Salem was born El Hedi ben Salem m'Barek Mohammed Mustafa in a small village in Morocco to a well to do Hartani family. At the age of 15, he married a 13-year-old girl. He and his wife eventually had five children and settled in a town near the Atlas Mountains. By the early 1970s, Salem had left his wife and children and moved to Europe.

Career
In early 1971, Salem met German film director Rainer Werner Fassbinder at a homosexual sauna in Paris, and the two began a romantic relationship. He moved to Germany with Fassbinder and became a part of the director's entourage. He played several minor roles in Fassbinder's films. Fassbinder eventually cast Salem in the lead role in Ali: Fear Eats the Soul (1974), a film that explores xenophobia in post-World War II Germany. In the film, Salem portrays a Moroccan immigrant living in Germany who begins a relationship with an older German woman whom he eventually marries. The film brought Fassbinder worldwide critical acclaim and became Salem’s best known role. Throughout the mid-1970s, Salem continued to appear in Fassbinder’s films in supporting roles. His final onscreen role was in Fassbinder’s romantic drama Fox and His Friends in 1975.

Relationship with Fassbinder
Salem and Fassbinder's relationship was reportedly tumultuous. They fought frequently due in part to Salem's short temper, which turned violent when he drank. While Salem and Fassbinder were living together in Germany, Fassbinder convinced Salem to bring his two teenaged sons, who lived in Morocco with Salem’s estranged wife, to live with them. Against their mother’s wishes, Salem brought the boys to Germany.

The arrangement did not last long as the boys were unprepared for life in a different culture, and they often were subjected to racism. While Fassbinder considered the boys his own, neither he nor Salem was up to the task of raising children. Both frequently drank, took drugs and often left the boys with various friends. One of Salem's sons returned to his mother in Morocco, and the other went to different homes and finally a reformatory.

In 1974, Fassbinder ended the relationship due to Salem's violence and drinking. After the breakup, Salem's alcoholism worsened. Director Daniel Schmid, one of Fassbinder's close friends, later told film critic Roger Ebert that shortly after the break up, Salem got drunk and "went to a place in Berlin and stabbed three people." Salem then returned to Fassbinder and told him "You don't have to be afraid anymore."

Death
After the stabbings, none of which were fatal, Salem fled to France aided by Fassbinder and his friends. Schmid later recalled that Salem had to be "virtually smuggled out of Germany" and that Fassbinder cried the entire time they were driving Salem out of Berlin.

While in France, Salem was arrested and jailed. While in custody at a prison in Nîmes in 1977, Salem hanged himself. News of Salem's death was kept from Fassbinder for years. He did not learn of his former lover's death until shortly before his own death in 1982. Fassbinder dedicated Querelle (1982), his last film, to Salem.

In popular culture
In 2012, a documentary on Salem's life titled My Name Is Not Ali, premiered at the Montreal World Film Festival. The film was directed by German filmmaker Viola Shafik.

Filmography

References

External links

1930s births
1977 deaths
1977 suicides
Year of birth uncertain
20th-century Moroccan male actors
LGBT male actors
Moroccan LGBT people
Moroccan expatriates in France
Moroccan expatriates in Germany
Moroccan male film actors
Moroccan male television actors
People who committed suicide in prison custody
Suicides by hanging in France
LGBT-related suicides
20th-century LGBT people